Suhor pri Dolenjskih Toplicah is a small settlement in the Municipality of Dolenjske Toplice in Slovenia. The area is part of the historical region of Lower Carniola. The municipality is now included in the Southeast Slovenia Statistical Region.

Name
The name of the settlement was changed from Suhor to Suhor pri Dolenjskih Toplicah in 1953.

References

External links
Suhor pri Dolenjskih Toplicah on Geopedia

Populated places in the Municipality of Dolenjske Toplice